Tangestan County is in Bushehr province, Iran. The capital of the county is the city of Ahram. At the 2006 census, the county's population was 63,276 in 14,620 households. The following census in 2011 counted 70,282 people in 18,268 households. At the 2016 census, the county's population was 76,706 in 22,080 households.

The Tangestan region in southern Iran is well-known for its resistance to the invasion by British forces in the late 19th century. Tangestan County is the home of the group of people known as Tangesier. Rais Ali Delvari, the commander of Tangesier fighters, is known as a national hero in the region. Tangestan is also famous in Iran for its high-quality dates.

Administrative divisions

The population history and structural changes of Tangestan County's administrative divisions over three consecutive censuses are shown in the following table. The latest census shows two districts, four rural districts, and three cities.

References

External links
 http://www.itto.org/tourismattractions/?sight=2162
 http://tajikam.com/forums/showthread.php?p=7957

 

Counties of Bushehr Province